The Impossible Woman is a 1919 British silent comedy film directed by Meyrick Milton and starring Constance Collier, Langhorn Burton and Christine Rayner. It was based on the 1912 novel Tante by Anne Douglas Sedgwick, and 1916 play of the same name by C. Haddon Chambers.

Cast
 Constance Collier as Mme. Kraska
 Langhorn Burton as Gregory Jardine
 Christine Rayner as Karen
 Alan Byrne as Edwin Drew
 Edith Craig as Mrs. Talcotte

References

External links
 

British comedy films
British silent feature films
Films directed by Meyrick Milton
1919 comedy films
Films based on British novels
Ideal Film Company films
British black-and-white films
1910s English-language films
1910s British films
Silent comedy films